Flash Gordon is a science fiction hero.

Flash Gordon may also refer to:

A 1935 26-episode Flash Gordon radio serial
Flash Gordon (serial), a 1936 serial film
Flash Gordon: The Greatest Adventure of All, a 1982 animated television film
Flash Gordon (film), a 1980 science fiction film
Flash Gordon (soundtrack), an album by Queen, the soundtrack album of the 1980 film
Flash Gordon (1954 TV series), a science fiction television series based on the characters of the Alex Raymond-created comic strip of the same name
The New Adventures of Flash Gordon, a 1979-1982 animated television series
Flash Gordon (1996 TV series), a 1996 animated television series
Flash Gordon (2007 TV series), a 2007 live action television series from the Sci Fi Channel
Flash Gordon (video game), a 1986 computer game
Flash Gordon (pinball), a pinball machine produced by Bally

People 
Joe Gordon (born 1915), nicknamed Flash, US baseball player
Tom Gordon (born 1967), nicknamed Flash, US baseball player
Gordon Watson (footballer, born 1971), nicknamed Flash, former English professional footballer
Donald "Flash" Gordon (1920–2010), World War II flying ace
Flash Gordon (physician), physician and author
Josh Gordon, nicknamed Flash, American wide receiver for the Seattle Seahawks

Lists of people by nickname